The Glendale School District is a rural, public school district in Flinton, Cambria County, Pennsylvania and Clearfield County, Pennsylvania. It serves Irvona Borough, Coalport Borough, and Beccaria Township in Clearfield County, and Reade Township and White Township in Cambria County. Glendale School District encompasses approximately 60 square miles. According to 2000 federal census data, it serves a resident population of 5,582. Per 2010 US Census Bureau data, the resident population declined to 5,407 people. The educational attainment levels for the school district population (25 years old and over) were 86.3% high school graduates and 6.9% college graduates. The district is one of the 500 public school districts of Pennsylvania.

According to the Pennsylvania Budget and Policy Center, 50.5% of Glendale School District's pupils lived at 185% or below the Federal Poverty Level   as shown by their eligibility for the federal free or reduced price school meal programs in 2012. In 2009, the district residents' per capita income was $12,955, while the median family income was $32,764. In the Commonwealth, the median family income was $49,501 and the United States median family income was $49,445, in 2010. In Clearfield County, the median household income was $37,130. By 2013, the median household income in the United States rose to $52,100.

Glendale School District operates two schools: Glendale Junior/Senior High School and Glendale Elementary School. High school students may choose to attend Greater Altoona Career and Technology Center for training in the construction and mechanical trades. The Central Intermediate Unit IU10 provides the district with a wide variety of services like: specialized education for disabled students and hearing; background checks for employees; state mandated recognizing and reporting child abuse training; speech and visual disability services and professional development for staff and faculty.

Extracurriculars
Glendale School District offers a wide variety of clubs, activities and sports.

Clubs and activities

 Marching Band
 Jazz Band
 Academic Decathlon
 National Honor Society
 America's Pride
 Drama Club
 SADD
 Aevidum
 Science Club
 Student Council
 Tri-M
 Viking Voyager
 Varsity Club
 Yearbook
 Chorus

Athletics
Varsity

 Baseball - Class A
 Basketball - Class A
 Football - Class A
 Wrestling - Class AA

Girls
 Basketball - Class A
 Softball - Class A
 Volleyball - Class A

Junior high school sports

 Basketball - Class A
 Football - Class A
 Wrestling - Class AA

Girls
 Basketball - Class A
 Softball - Class A

According to PIAA directory July 2015

References

External links
 Glendale School District
 Penna. Inter-Scholastic Assn.

School districts in Cambria County, Pennsylvania
School districts in Clearfield County, Pennsylvania